The Maryland Terrapins men's college basketball team competes in the National Collegiate Athletic Association's (NCAA) Division I, representing the University of Maryland in the Big Ten Conference. Maryland has played its home games at Xfinity Center in College Park, Maryland since its opening in 2002.

Seasons

   1988 NCAA Tournament appearance was vacated due to ineligible players; official record is 17–12.

References

 
Maryland
Maryland Terrapins basketball seasons